Massimo D'Ambrosio (born 5 June 2003) is a professional Australian rules footballer with the Essendon Football Club in the Australian Football League (AFL).

Early career

D'Ambrosio began his football journey with the Point Cook Football Club, his talent was earned him four WRFL junior best and fairest awards in six seasons. He won twice as a under 11 (2013, 2014), again as under 12 (2015) and finally as a under 15 in (2018). He was selected for the Western Jets development program and later became a  top up player in case of Covid protocols in 2022. He displayed his elite kicking while starring for the Young Guns, with high possessions games in successive weeks.

AFL career

D'Ambrosio was the third player picked in the 2022 mid-season draft, having made an impression playing for Richmond in the Victorian Football League. He made his debut against , where he accumulated 15 disposals in a 35-point victory.

Statistics
Updated to the end of round 15, 2022.

|- 
| 2022 ||  || 42
| 2 || — || — || 17 || 12 || 29 || 7 || 2 || — || — || — || — || — || — || — || 
|- class="sortbottom"
! colspan=3| Career
! 2 !! 0 !! 0 !! 17 !! 12 !! 29 !! 7 !! 2 !! 0.0 !! 0.0 !! 8.5 !! 6.0 !! 14.5 !! 3.5 !! 1.0 !! 0
|}

References

External links
massimo-d-ambrosio profile

Living people
2003 births
Essendon Football Club players
Richmond Football Club players
Western Jets players